Antonio Nicomedes Gerona, Sr. (c. 1933 - October 13, 2013) was a Filipino lawyer and jurist, known as the father of former Vice President Leni Robredo.

Career 
Gerona practiced law for 19 years before being appointed as a judge of the Municipal Trial Court in Cities, Branch 2 on July 9, 1980. He also served as a judge of Regional Trial Court Branch 28 in Naga City from January 30, 1987. Since 1995, Gerona was also a professor of Law at the University of Nueva Caceres in Naga City.

Personal life
Antonio Gerona hails from the Gerona clan of Bulan, Sorsogon. He married Salvacion Santo Tomas of Naga City. 

He died on October 10, 2013 at the Mother Seton Hospital in Naga City due to cardiac arrest.

References 

2013 deaths
People from Naga, Camarines Sur
20th-century Filipino judges
Year of birth uncertain